Simacauda virescens is a moth of the family Incurvariidae. It was described by Nielsen and Davis in 1981. It is found in Argentina.

References

Moths described in 1981
Incurvariidae
Moths of South America